Heather Keeler (born December 18, 1981) is an American politician serving in the Minnesota House of Representatives since 2021. A member of the Democratic-Farmer-Labor Party (DFL), Keeler represents District 4A in northwest Minnesota, including the city of Moorhead and parts of Clay County. Keeler is an enrolled member of the Yankton Sioux Tribe.

Early life, education and career
Keeler grew up on her tribal homeland in South Dakota, mostly living at Fort Pierre. She moved to the Fargo–Moorhead area while attending Minnesota State University for her B.S. in project management and M.Ed. in educational leadership.

Keeler worked at North Dakota State University as an assistant director of multicultural recruitment and volunteered in the Moorhead school district. While working with the school district, she served on the human rights advisory committee and as vice chair of Moorhead's Human Rights Commission.

Minnesota House of Representatives
Keeler was elected to the Minnesota House of Representatives in 2020 and was reelected in 2022. She first ran after four-term DFL incumbent Ben Lien announced he would not seek reelection. 

In 2021-22, Keeler served as vice chair of the Preventing Homelessness Division of the Housing Committee. She serves as vice chair of the Children and Families Finance and Policy Committee and also sits on the Education Policy and Human Services Finance Committees. She is a member of the People of Color and Indigenous (POCI) Caucus.

Keeler has been an outspoken advocate of Native American human rights issues and for more native voices to be heard at the state legislature. In 2021, she authored legislation that created an office of Missing and Murdered Indigenous Relatives and carried subsequent efforts to increase funding. Indigenous women make up one percent of the state's population but eight percent of women and girls murdered.

Along with State Senators Mary Kunesh and Jen McEwen, Keeler authored a letter calling on the Biden administration to stop Line 3, a tar sands pipeline proposed to cut through Minnesota tribal lands. She proposed legislation that would replace Minnesota's existing Columbus Day with Indigenous People's Day.

Keeler has supported efforts to increase the number of teachers of color in Minnesota. In 2023, she authored legislation that passed with unanimous support to fund emergency food shelves in the midst of rising visits to food shelves.

On March 7, 2023, Keeler drew headlines when she posted on Facebook, "I’m sick of white Christians adopting our babies and rejoicing. It’s a really sad day when that happens. It means the genocide continues. If you care about our babies, advocate against the genocide. Help the actual issues impacting indigenous parents, stop stealing our babies and changing their names under the impression you are helping. White saviors are the worst!" In response, the chair of the Minnesota Republican Party accused Keeler of racism and called on her to resign.

Electoral history

Personal life
Keeler lives in Moorhead, Minnesota and has two children. She is an enrolled member of the Yankton Sioux Tribe.

References

External links 

 Official House of Representatives website
 Official campaign website

Living people
Democratic Party members of the Minnesota House of Representatives
21st-century American politicians
21st-century American women politicians
Native American women in politics
Women state legislators in Minnesota
Minnesota State University Moorhead alumni
Year of birth missing (living people)
21st-century Native American women
21st-century Native Americans